Beanou-Junior Brandon Deflo Soppy (born 21 February 2002) is a French professional footballer who plays as right-back for  club Atalanta.

Club career 
Soppy began playing football at Bobigny, before joining CFFP aged 12–13. He moved to INF Clairefontaine, and later signed for Rennes's youth academy. He signed his first professional contract with Rennes aged 16; the following year, he played for their reserve team in the Championnat National 3. In August 2020, Soppy made his Ligue 1 debut aged 18, in a 2–2 draw against Lille.

In summer 2021, he joined Udinese in the Serie A; he played 30 games during the 2021–22 season – 28 in the league. On 19 August 2022, Soppy joined fellow Serie A side Atalanta.

Style of play 
Initially a centre-back, Soppy moved to right-back at the end of his first year at Rennes. He is known for his direct style of play and crossing ability.

References

External links
 Profile at Atalanta B.C.
 
 
 
 

2002 births
Living people
Sportspeople from Aubervilliers
Footballers from Seine-Saint-Denis
French sportspeople of Ivorian descent
French footballers
Association football fullbacks
Stade Rennais F.C. players
Udinese Calcio players
Atalanta B.C. players
Ligue 1 players
Serie A players
France youth international footballers
French expatriate footballers
French expatriate sportspeople in Italy
Expatriate footballers in Italy